Ammittamru I (Known by some sources as Amishtammru I or Amistammru I) was a king of the ancient Syrian city of Ugarit who ruled c. 1350 BC.

Reign 
The first mention of him is EA 45 sent by Ammittamru I to Egypt, either in the late reign of Amenophis III or in the first years of Akhenaten. The damaged letter includes emphatic promises of allegiance to Egypt, as the occasion is said to be the repeated threats from a king of a land whose name is broken off, it's said to possibly be the land of the Hittites due to their long struggle with the Egyptians. Another good example for such letters that show submission to Egypt is KTU 2.23 = RS 16.078+.15-24 sent to a contemporary pharaoh that says:

Succession 
After his death, he was succeeded by his son, Niqmaddu II.

References

Ugaritic kings
14th-century BC people